Saibai may refer to:

Saibai Island, in Australia's Torres Straits
Saibai, Queensland, a town on the island
Saibai Island Airport
Maharani Saibai, a Maratha queen
Saibai Yuuki, a To Love-Ru character